Dumitru Solomon was a Romanian author of essays, plays, and chronicles.

He was born in Galați on December 14, 1932 and died on 9 February, 2003. He attended the theoretical high-school in Bârlad. In 1955, he obtained his degree in philology in Bucharest. Between 1955-1962, he was the editor of Gazeta literară, then department chief at Luceafărul, and editor-in-chief of Teatrul azi magazine. He made his debut in Viața Românească, in 1953.

He was a laureate of the Romanian Academy (1978), and Writers Union and Association of Writers Union from Bucharest (1973). He received the U.N.I.T.E.R. award for the best Romanian play, Repetabila scenă a balconului (1995), and an award from the Ministry of Culture.

Works
His works include:
"Problema intelectualului în opera lui Camil Petrescu" (essay)
"Dispariția" (dramatic sketch)
Socrate, Diogene câinele
"Teatrul ca metaforă" (essay)
Teatrul
Repetabila scenă a balconului

References

External links
 Short Play: 'Logical and Beautiful' by Dumitru Solomon

1932 births
People from Galați
Romanian dramatists and playwrights
Romanian essayists
2003 deaths
20th-century Romanian dramatists and playwrights
20th-century essayists